BPT may refer to:
 Nickname of Bridgeport, Connecticut, US
BPT Diagram
Bachelor of Physiotherapy
Benign paroxysmal torticollis, a rare medical disorder
 BP Prudhoe Bay Royalty Trust, NYSE symbol
 Broken Picture Telephone, a collaborative game
 Business process transformation
 Jack Brooks Regional Airport (formerly Southeast Texas Regional Airport), IATA airport code
 Battle physical training for Royal Marines and Royal Marines Reserve
 A variant of the Mazda B engine
 Biblioteca pentru toți